The 1982 Senate election in Maryland took place on November 2, 1982, simultaneously with other elections for seats in the U.S. Senate and House of Representatives in addition to gubernatorial openings. Incumbent Democratic Senator Paul Sarbanes won reelection to a second term in office. He defeated the Republican nominee, former Representative from Maryland's 5th district and Prince George's County Executive Lawrence Hogan. Sarbanes even was able to win ruby-red Garrett County, which has never voted Democratic in presidential elections. Sarbanes would repeat this feat 6 years later in 1988, but no Democrat has ever won Garrett County in a Senate election since then.

Major candidates

Democratic 
Paul Sarbanes, incumbent U.S. Senator since 1977.

Republican 
Lawrence Hogan, former U.S. Representative from Maryland's 5th congressional district from 1969 to 1975.

Results 
}}

Results by county

Counties that flipped from Democrat to Republican
Allegany
Caroline
Garrett
Talbot
Worcester

See also
1982 United States Senate elections
1982 United States elections

References

Notes

1982
Maryland
United States Senate